The Hot Springs Federal Courthouse is located at 100 Reserve Street in Hot Springs, Arkansas.  It is a three-story building, with a steel frame clad in orange brick, with porcelain panels and aluminum-clad windows.  It was designed by the Little Rock firm Wittenberg, Delony & Davidson, and was built in 1959–60 on the site of the Eastman Hotel, once one of the city's largest spa hotels.  It is one of the city's best examples of commercial International architecture.

The courthouse was listed on the National Register of Historic Places in 2015 as the Federal Building–U.S. Post Office and Court House.

See also
National Register of Historic Places listings in Garland County, Arkansas

References

Courthouses on the National Register of Historic Places in Arkansas
Neoclassical architecture in Arkansas
Government buildings completed in 1905
Buildings and structures in Hot Springs, Arkansas
National Register of Historic Places in Hot Springs, Arkansas
1905 establishments in Arkansas